Vittring is a song written by Magnus Uggla, and recorded by himself on the 1978 album Vittring. It was also released as a single the same year. Uggla subsequently recorded a version with lyrics in English, titled "Everything You Do".

The single peaked at 12th position on the Swedish singles chart, but Magnus Uggla himself said it failed.

Charts

References

External links

1978 singles
Columbia Records singles
Songs written by Magnus Uggla
Magnus Uggla songs
Swedish-language songs
1978 songs